Jonny Ferney Mosquera Mena (born 17 February 1991) is a Colombian footballer who plays as a defensive midfielder.

Career

Honours

Club
Avaí
Campeonato Catarinense: 2019

International
Colombia U20
 Toulon Tournament: 2011

References

External links
Official profile at Livorno Calcio

1991 births
Living people
Association football midfielders
Colombian footballers
Categoría Primera A players
Categoría Primera B players
Campeonato Brasileiro Série A players
Serie A players
Serie B players
Envigado F.C. players
América de Cali footballers
U.S. Livorno 1915 players
Avaí FC players
Águilas Doradas Rionegro players
Colombia under-20 international footballers
Colombian expatriate footballers
Colombian expatriate sportspeople in Italy
Colombian expatriate sportspeople in Brazil
Expatriate footballers in Italy
Expatriate footballers in Brazil
Footballers from Medellín